Alain Gérard Ketchemen (born July 15, 1985) is a Cameroonian football player.

Career
Ketchemen started his football career with  Athletic Club Douala a Cameroonian football D2 Club after obtaining training from Formation centre of Brasseries of Cameroon. He played for few other Cameroonian football clubs before crossing over to North Africa, where he played in Morocco for Moghreb Athletic Tétouan and in Algeria with JSM Béjaïa, CR Belouizdad and  MC Oran respectively. In 2008, Ketchenman went to Clube Desportivo dos Olivais e Moscavide, where he played for six months.

References

External links
 

1985 births
Living people
Cameroonian footballers
Expatriate footballers in Algeria
JSM Béjaïa players
Cameroonian expatriate sportspeople in Morocco
MC Oran players
Expatriate footballers in Portugal
Cameroonian expatriate sportspeople in Algeria
CR Belouizdad players
Expatriate footballers in Morocco
C.D. Olivais e Moscavide players
Cameroonian expatriate sportspeople in Portugal
Moghreb Tétouan players
Douala Athletic Club players
Association football forwards